Theodosius II was King of the Abkhazia from circa 828 to 855. He was the son and successor of Leon II of the Anchabadze dynasty.

Life 
Theodosius II supported his relative Ashot I of Iberia, ruler of Tao-Klarjeti, against Principality of Kakheti and its ally Arab emir of Tiflis, that invaded Inner Iberia (Shida Kartli), as a result Kakhetians were pushed from central Iberian lands to east of the Ksani River. In 837, Byzantine Emperor Theophilos sent patrikios Bardas together with the general Theophobos in a campaign against the Abkhazians, but the Byzantines were defeated.

Theodosius II died without heir and he was succeeded by his younger brother Demetrius II of Abkhazia, who disputed the throne for many years.

Genealogy

References

Sources 

 Marie-Félicité Brosset, Histoire de la Géorgie.

Theodosius 02